Laura Fares, known as LAU or Lau Fares (born February 14, 1978, Buenos Aires) is an Argentine singer-songwriter, drummer, and producer from Argentina, and currently based in Barcelona (Spain), after 21 years in the United Kingdom. She is also the founder of Aztec Records with Ariel Amejeiras.

Biography 
Self taught as a drummer and guitarist from the age of 17, she formed her first music band in Argentina, called Isis.  Based in the UK between 1999 and 2020, LAU studied music at City & Islington College and got a degree in Popular Music Performance at the London College of Music & Media, through Thames Valley University and Drumtech. Soon after finishing her degree, LAU went off on tour as a session drummer for different pop stars like Jont, Sam Sparro, Taio Cruz, Ricky Martin, Clean Bandit, The Wanted, Big Black Delta and others, opening for artists like Robyn, Adele, The Presets and One Direction. She became a songwriter simultaneously and was first published by Oval Music, funded by legendary BBC Radio Charlie Gillett and mentored by BBC music composer David Lowe.

She was co-founder of Disco Damage in 2007, and professional DJ since 2008. She set up independent Synthpop/synthwave record label Aztec Records in 2010 with her friend Ariel Amejeiras, where she is the Creative Director. Synthpop/synthwave is a sub-genre determined by modern electronic music and nostalgia for the pop culture of the 80s. The label has developed and released artists such as Bright Light Bright Light, NINA, Sunglasses Kid, Bunny X and many others.

In 2010 LAU teamed up with NINA to write two  albums: Sleepwalking and Synthian, which took them on several tours around the world, including opening for Erasure in 2014 on their Violet Flame Tour in the United States. The duo also co-wrote a song called "The Wire", which was remixed by Ricky Wilde and had Kim Wilde featuring on it. The writing duo also remixed five tracks from the Drive soundtrack by Cliff Martinez, released by Lakeshore Records in 2020. The duo also appeared in the London movie premiere for The Rise of the Synths, where their songs were used.

Solo career 

In 2020 LAU launched her solo project as a retrowave/synthpop singer and songwriter and released four singles, ahead of her debut album 'Believer' released in February 2021. LAU's debut album includes Synthwave, Retrowave and Synth-pop tracks with a heavy 80s influence, and talks about a bad breakup, moving on from a past relationship and believing in herself after so many years behind other artists, as mentioned on Billboard.

LAU's second studio album 'Circumstance' was released on February 14, 2022, and includes tracks produced by Brian Skeel, Ends 84, TAKTA, Popcorn Kid, Saint Innocent and her own version of the Cyndi Lauper classic 'True Colors', produced by Zak Vortex. The album talks about the uncertainty of a distant relationship and falling in love in the times of pandemic, as she explained on Mixmag. The album includes Synth-pop, Retrowave and Nu-Disco songs.

In 2022 LAU's track 'Stunning' was used on the "Frozen Flowers" Victoria's Secret ad campaign, featuring Hailey Bieber.

That same year LAU was selected by industry experts as one of the 76 artists chosen for Keychange, a European programme that promotes and empowers women and gender minorities in the music industry. That same year, LAU's album 'Believer' was nominated for the Spanish MIN awards in these categories: Best Album, Best Artist, Song of the Year, Best Producer and Best Graphic Design.

Awards 

Amazon Music BIME Equity Awards 2022 (Best Song) - Finalist
MIN Awards 2021 and 2022 (Best Song and Best Album) - Nominated
Give Her Your Love (Best Music Video)
2022 Winner: International Queer Film Festival
2022 Winner: PARAI Musical International Awards
<p>2022 Winner: Bluez Dolphins International Short Film Fest 
2022 Official Selection: Black Panther International Short Film Festival
2022 Official Selection: Barcelona Indie Filmmakers Festival
2022 Official Selection: Madrid Indie Film Festival
2022 Official Selection: Brighton Rocks Film Festival
2022 Official Selection: Buenos Aires International Film Festival
2022 Official Selection: Los Angeles Lift-Off Film Festival
2022 Official Selection: Prague International Film Awards

Discography

Singles

As lead artist 

 2020: "Stunning"
 2020: "We Had Magic"
 2020: "Recognise"
 2020: "True"
 2021: "The Cards" 
 2021: "True Colors" (with Zak Vortex)
 2021: "Undecided"
 2021: "Give Her Your Love"
 2021: "What To Do"
 2022: "Instant Sunshine"
 2022: “Shout” (with LLUVA)

As featured artist 

 2020: "Get Up" (Jordan F feat. NINA and LAU)
 2020: "Free Forever" (Popcorn Kid & LAU)
 2021: "Bad Thing" (Sight Telma Club & LAU)
 2021: "Drown Your Sorrow" (Maxx Parker & LAU)
 2021: "Never" (Syntronix & LAU)
 2021: "The Waves" (LLUVA & LAU)
 2021: “We Gave It A Try” (Popcorn Kid & LAU)
 2022: “Impossible Love” (LLUVA & LAU)
 2022: “Galaxy” (EhRah & LAU)
 2022: “Give Me A Sign” (EhRah & LAU)
 2022: “Find Love” (Jessy Mach & LAU)
 2022: “Irracional” (The Broken Flowers Project & LAU) - in Spanish
 2022: "Walk Away" (Space Tourist & LAU)

Albums

As lead artist 

2021: Believer
2021: Believer (Deluxe)
2022: Circumstance
2022: Circumstance (The Remixes)

As featured artist 

 2018: Sleepwalking (NINA feat. LAU)
 2020: Synthian (NINA feat. LAU)
 2020: Synthian (The Remixes) (NINA feat. LAU)
 2020: Control EP (NINA feat. LAU)

References

External links 

 Interview Forgedinneon
 Interview Vents Magazine
 Aztec Records

Synthwave musicians
Argentine women singer-songwriters
Argentine singer-songwriters
1978 births
Living people
Argentine drummers